The West African ladyfish (Elops lacerate) is a species of ray-finned fish in the family Elopidae. It is native to the coastal waters of the eastern Atlantic Ocean, from Senegal to Angola. It is also known as the Guinean ladyfish.

Threats 
This species uses estuarine areas and hypersaline lagoons; changes in the quality of these habitats may affect this species' population dynamics.  Although this species may not be closely associated with any single habitat, it may be adversely affected by development and urbanization.

References

West African ladyfish
Fish of the East Atlantic
Marine fauna of West Africa
West African ladyfish